Rushlee Buchanan (born 20 January 1988) is a New Zealand track and road cyclist. She competed at the 2020 Summer Olympics, in Women's madison, and Women's team pursuit.

Career 
She won bronze at the 2010 UCI Track Cycling World Championships in the Team Pursuit.

She competed in the scratch, points and road races at both the 2010 and 2014 Commonwealth Games.

She has won the women's New Zealand road race championships a record four times, in 2010, 2014, 2016 and 2017. She won the New Zealand time trial championships in 2016.

Personal life
Buchanan is married to American cyclist Adrian Hegyvary.

Major results
Source:

Track

2005
 2nd  Points race, UCI Juniors World Championships
2006
 2nd Individual pursuit, National Junior Track Championships
2010
 1st  Team pursuit, 2010–11 UCI Track Cycling World Cup Classics, Cali
 National Track Championships
1st  Scratch
1st  Team pursuit
3rd Omnium
 3rd  Team pursuit, UCI Track Cycling World Championships
2011
 1st  Team pursuit, 2010–11 UCI Track Cycling World Cup Classics, Beijing
2013
 Oceania Track Championships
1st  Scratch
1st  Team pursuit
 Madison Cup
1st Points race
3rd Keirin
 Challenge International sur piste
1st Scratch
3rd Individual pursuit
 Invercargill
1st Points race
3rd Scratch
 National Track Championships
3rd Individual pursuit
3rd Points race
2016
 2nd Points race, Festival of Speed
2017
 Oceania Track Championships
1st  Team pursuit
2nd  Omnium
 National Track Championships
1st  Points race
1st  Team pursuit
2nd Individual pursuit
2nd Scratch
3rd Omnium
 3rd  Team pursuit, UCI Track Cycling World Championships
2018
 1st  Team pursuit, Oceania Track Championships
 2nd  Team pursuit, Commonwealth Games
 3rd  Omnium, UCI Track Cycling World Championships
2019
 3rd  Team pursuit, UCI Track Cycling World Championships

Road

2006
 1st  Road race, National Junior Road Championships
2007
 1st Mount Maunganui
 3rd Overall Tour de Delta
1st Stage 2
2009
 1st  Criterium, National Road Championships
2010
 1st  Road race, National Road Championships
2011
 National Road Championships
2nd Criterium
3rd Road race
2014
 1st  Road race, National Road Championships
2015
 9th Overall Joe Martin Stage Race
2016
 National Road Championships
1st  Road race
1st  Time trial
2017
 National Road Championships
1st  Road race
1st  Criterium
3rd Time trial
2018
 2nd Time trial, National Road Championships
 5th Time trial, Commonwealth Games
 5th Chrono Gatineau
 8th Overall BeNe Ladies Tour
 10th Overall Tour de Feminin-O cenu Českého Švýcarska
 10th Grand Prix Cycliste de Gatineau
2019
 2nd Time trial, National Road Championships

References

External links

1988 births
Commonwealth Games medallists in cycling
Commonwealth Games silver medallists for New Zealand
Cyclists at the 2010 Commonwealth Games
Cyclists at the 2014 Commonwealth Games
Cyclists at the 2016 Summer Olympics
Cyclists at the 2018 Commonwealth Games
Cyclists at the 2020 Summer Olympics
Living people
New Zealand female cyclists
Olympic cyclists of New Zealand
Sportspeople from Hamilton, New Zealand
New Zealand track cyclists
Medallists at the 2018 Commonwealth Games